Aluminium–air batteries (Al–air batteries) produce electricity from the reaction of oxygen in the air with aluminium. They have one of the highest energy densities of all batteries, but they are not widely used because of problems with high anode cost and byproduct removal when using traditional electrolytes. This has restricted their use to mainly military applications. However, an electric vehicle with aluminium batteries has the potential for up to eight times the range of a lithium-ion battery with a significantly lower total weight.

Aluminium–air batteries are primary cells, i.e., non-rechargeable. Once the aluminium anode is consumed by its reaction with atmospheric oxygen at a cathode immersed in a water-based electrolyte to form hydrated aluminium oxide, the battery will no longer produce electricity. However, it is possible to mechanically recharge the battery with new aluminium anodes made from recycling the hydrated aluminium oxide. Such recycling would be essential if aluminium–air batteries were to be widely adopted.

Aluminium-powered vehicles have been under discussion for some decades. Hybridisation mitigates the costs, and in 1989 road tests of a hybridised aluminium–air/lead–acid battery in an electric vehicle were reported. An aluminium-powered plug-in hybrid minivan was demonstrated in Ontario in 1990.

In March 2013, Phinergy released a video demonstration of an electric car using aluminium–air cells driven 330 km using a special cathode and potassium hydroxide. On May 27, 2013, the Israeli channel 10 evening news broadcast showed a car with Phinergy battery in the back, claiming  range before replacement of the aluminum anodes is necessary.

Electrochemistry 

The anode oxidation half-reaction is Al +  →  + 3e− -2.31 V.

The cathode reduction half-reaction is  +  + 4e− →  +0.40 V.

The total reaction is 4Al +  +  →  +2.71 V.

About 1.2 volts potential difference is created by these reactions and is achievable in practice when potassium hydroxide is used as the electrolyte. Saltwater electrolyte achieves approximately 0.7 volts per cell.

The specific voltage of the cell can vary depending upon the composition of the electrolyte as well as the structure and materials of the cathode.

Other metals can be used in a similar way, such as lithium-air, zinc-air, manganese-air, and sodium-air, some with a higher energy density. However, aluminium is attractive as the most stable metal.

Commercialization

Issues 

Aluminium as a "fuel" for vehicles has been studied by Yang and Knickle. In 2002, they concluded:

Technical problems remain to be solved to make Al–air batteries suitable for electric vehicles. Anodes made of pure aluminium are corroded by the electrolyte, so the aluminium is usually alloyed with tin or other elements. The hydrated alumina that is created by the cell reaction forms a gel-like substance at the anode and reduces the electricity output. This is an issue being addressed in the development work on Al–air cells. For example, additives that form the alumina as a powder rather than a gel have been developed.

Modern air cathodes consist of a reactive layer of carbon with a nickel-grid current collector, a catalyst (e.g., cobalt), and a porous hydrophobic PTFE film that prevents electrolyte leakage. The oxygen in the air passes through the PTFE then reacts with the water to create hydroxide ions. These cathodes work well, but they can be expensive.

Traditional Al–air batteries had a limited shelf life, because the aluminium reacted with the electrolyte and produced hydrogen when the battery was not in use; this is no longer the case with modern designs. The problem can be avoided by storing the electrolyte in a tank outside the battery and transferring it to the battery when it is required for use.

These batteries can be used as reserve batteries in telephone exchanges and as backup power sources.

Another problem is the cost of materials that need to be added to the battery to avoid power dropping. Aluminum is still very cheap compared to other elements used to build batteries. Aluminum costs $2.55 per kilogram while lithium and nickel cost $15.75 and $18.75 per kilogram respectively. However, one other element typically used in aluminum air as a catalyst in the cathode is silver, which costs about $773 dollars per kilogram (2021 prices). 

Aluminium–air batteries may become an effective solution for marine applications due to their high energy density, low cost, and the abundance of aluminum, with no emissions at the point of use in boats and ships.
Phinergy Marine, Log 9 Materials, RiAlAiR and several other commercial companies are working on commercial and military applications in the marine environment.

Research and development is taking place on alternative, safer, and higher performance electrolytes such as organic solvents and ionic liquids.

See also 
 List of battery types
 Zinc–air battery
 Potassium-ion battery
 Metal–air electrochemical cell
 Aluminum-ion battery
 Aluminum battery

References

External links 
 Aluminum battery from Stanford offers safe alternative to conventional batteries
 Aluminium battery can charge phone in one minute, scientists say
 Simple homemade aluminum-air battery

Electrochemical cells
Aluminium
Metal–air batteries
Disposable batteries